Ilaiyankudi block is a revenue block in the Sivaganga district of Tamil Nadu, India. It has a total of 52 panchayat villages.Ilayangudi is a Tehsil / Block (CD) in the Sivaganga District of Tamil Nadu. According to Census 2011 information the sub-district code of Ilayangudi block is 05834. Total area of Ilayangudi is 409 km2 including 391.88 km2 rural area and 16.86 km2 urban area. Ilayangudi has a population of 1,09,267 peoples. There are 28,395 houses in the sub-district. There are about 52 villages in Ilayangudi block, villages list below.

 List of Villages in Ilayangudi

 
 Villages by Population in Ilayangudi

  Population of Ilayangudi

  Households in Ilayangudi

References 

 

Revenue blocks of Sivaganga district